Scopula beckeraria is a moth of the family Geometridae. It was described by Julius Lederer in 1853. It is found in Italy, Croatia, North Macedonia, Greece, Bulgaria, Romania, Ukraine, Russia, Turkey, Armenia, Israel, Lebanon, Iran, Turkmenistan and Kazakhstan.

Subspecies
Scopula beckeraria beckeraria (southern Russia)
Scopula beckeraria amataria (Wehrli, 1927) (Siberia)
Scopula beckeraria assimilaria Prout, 1913 (Siberia, Turkmenistan, Kazakhstan)
Scopula beckeraria hermonicola Hausmann, 1997 (Israel, Lebanon, Iran)
Scopula beckeraria rebeli (Prout, 1913) (Balkan, Turkey and Armenia)

References

External links

Lepiforum e. V.

Moths of Europe
Moths of Asia
Moths described in 1853
beckeraria
Taxa named by Julius Lederer